Daniel Kane (25 January 194816 April 2021) was an Australian diplomat and linguist, and one of the world's foremost authorities on the extinct Jurchen and Khitan languages and their scripts.

Biography
Daniel Kane was born in January 1948 in Melbourne. Bereaved of his father when young, circumstances of extreme poverty constrained him to cut his education short and enter the work force at 16. He left school and joined a bank, working as a teller at a branch in Lygon Street, Carlton. There the then Dean of Arts at the university noticed he had a remarkable talent for languages, appearing to speak to Greek and Italian clients fluently  - he had picked up Italian, for one, listening and talking to the sons of immigrants at school in his preteen years - and invited him to finish high school and take up studies at the nearby university.   He undertook further education in his spare time and matriculated to Melbourne University with high honours.

He took a First Class Honours degree there in 1971, majoring in Chinese and Russian and was granted a Ph.D. scholarship to the ANU. His Ph.D. was conferred in 1975 with a thesis on the Jurchen language a Tungusic language a precursor of, and  related to Manchu spoken during the Jin dynasty in North China.

Parallel to his academic career, Kane has also had a career in diplomacy. He joined the Australian Department of Foreign Affairs in 1976 and was posted to Beijing for four years (1976-1980) during the early part of the reform period and particularly the period of the Democracy Wall which he rose early to read every morning and whose unsurpassed knowledge of which formed the basis of much of what was known outside China of that movement. He was also Cultural Counsellor at the Australian Embassy in Beijing for two years  in the 1990s (1995–1997).

Academically he was lecturer in Chinese at the University of Melbourne in 1981 and visiting scholar at the Department of Chinese at Peking University in 1988 and 1993. From 1997 he was Professor of Chinese at Macquarie University in Sydney until his retirement in 2012.

He was widowed in 2010 when his wife, the Shanghai scholar of Qing history and Chinese modernization, Yè Xiǎoqīng (葉曉青), died of cancer, after risking her initial recovery from an early diagnosis of cancer to bear their son Ian (易安 (Yìān).

Kane suffered for several years from Parkinson's disease.

Publications

Books

Papers

References

External links
 Professor Daniel Kane
Daniel Kane, 'The decipherment of dead languages in China: the case of Kitan,' George E. Morrison Lecture 19 October 2017  

1948 births
2021 deaths
Australian Esperantists
Australian sinologists
Linguists from Australia
Linguists of the Jurchen language
Linguists of Khitan
Academic staff of Macquarie University
People from Melbourne